The Light Across the Street is a 1956 French crime drama film directed by Georges Lacombe and starring Raymond Pellegrin, Roger Pigaut and Brigitte Bardot. It was also distributed in the U.S. under the title Female and the Flesh.

Plot
Sensual young Brigitte Bardot and her infirm husband run a small trucker restaurant in this Clouzot- influenced melodrama, before you can say The Postman Always Rings Twice, Brigitte feels attracted to a mechanic from the garage opposite

Cast
 Raymond Pellegrin as Georges Marceau 
 Roger Pigaut as Piétri 
 Brigitte Bardot as Olivia Marceau 
 Claude Romain as Barbette
 Jean Debucourt as Professor Nieumer
 Antonin Berval as Albert (as Berval)
 Daniel Ceccaldi as L'amoureux en panne 
 Guy Piérauld as Antoine
 Lucien Hubert as Gaspard
 Guy Pierauld as Antoine (as Guy Pierrault)

References

External links

Review of film at New York Times

1956 films
French drama films
Films directed by Georges Lacombe
Films scored by Norbert Glanzberg
1950s French-language films
1950s French films
1956 drama films
French black-and-white films